For the Love of Benji is a 1977 family film, directed and written by Joe Camp. It is the sequel to the original film, featuring Benji, and the second film in the Benji series, released on  June 10, 1977. It is the first Benji film to star Benjean, Higgins' daughter.

Plot

In Athens, Greece, a secret agent named Stelios goes to an outdoor café, where the waiter gives him newspapers and a package. The newspapers reveal that a German scientist is missing in Greece, and the package contains a photo of the dog Benji with his family. Meanwhile, in the U.S., Benji’s family arrives at an airport, on their way to the island of Crete in Greece. The children, Paul and Cindy, worry about their dogs, Benji and Tiffany, as they are placed in travel carriers. Cindy tells the airline representative that Tiffany has a “condition.” While waiting to check in, Mary learns that the man behind her in line, Chandler Dietrich, is also headed to Crete. Dietrich then sneaks into the employee-only luggage area, snatches Benji’s carrier off a conveyor belt, drugs the dog, and imprints a code on his paw. Upon arrival in Crete, Dietrich befriends Mary, while the family learns that Benji and Tiffany missed the connecting flight from Athens. Stelios lurks in the background, watching.

At the Athens airport, Benji and Tiffany are in their carriers, stored in a luggage room. When a worker inadvertently lets Benji escape, he and a British couple, Ronald and Elizabeth, chase the dog through the airport and across a runway, but Benji flees into the city. As he wanders the streets of Athens, Benji mistakes another family for his own. After several near collisions with cars, Benji retreats into ancient ruins. There, he sees a stray dog gnawing a bone. The other dog will not share his food, so Benji returns to the city streets. In a marketplace, Benji steals a string of sausages, and returns to the ruins to share them with the stray dog, thus making a new friend.

The next day, Benji returns to the marketplace, but the police capture him. Ronald and Elizabeth, claim the dog and take him to their home. Hearing a knock at the door and Ronald takes Benji upstairs as Elizabeth stalls their visitor, Stelios, who poses as a representative of Olympic Airways, and sends Stelios away. Soon, Mary comes to the house in search of Benji, and the dog hears her voice from upstairs. As she leaves, Benji barks at Mary from the window, but a passing truck drowns out the sound. So Benji climbs outside, slides down an awning and chases her taxi. Meanwhile, Dietrich pursues Benji in a sports car, but loses him. Alone again, Benji wanders to a hotel, where he spots Mary, Paul, and Cindy, but runs away when he sees Dietrich. Procuring a Doberman, Dietrich tracks Benji to the ruins. Sometime later, in the city, a butcher feeds Benji in his shop. Benji takes a nap, but is awakened by the Doberman barking. When Dietrich enters the shop, Benji springs from a cupboard and escapes.

After spending the night in the ruins, Benji stakes out his family’s hotel, but he is chased away by the doorman. Returning to the butcher’s shop, Benji sees his friend talking to Stelios, but before Benji can get their attention, Dietrich grabs the dog at gunpoint. However, Stelios and the butcher release the Doberman, whom Dietrich tied up outside the shop, and Stelios follows the Doberman to find Dietrich and Benji. As the Doberman leaps at Dietrich, Benji escapes once more. The Doberman chases Benji to the ruins, but the stray dog chases him away. Benji then returns to the hotel, sneaks inside on a luggage cart, and reunites with his family. However, Stelios arrives to announce that he has to take Benji away for a few days. Before Stelios can explain, Dietrich hits the man over the head with a gun, knocking him out. Dietrich then tells the family that he is a U.S. agent who must take Benji because the dog holds the key to important information. Instructing Mary to call the police and hold Stelios at gunpoint, Dietrich leaves with Benji. Stelios awakens and tells Mary that Dietrich is an impostor. The real Dietrich was found murdered in New Jersey and that this man is impersonating him for his own gain. Stelios explains he is a real secret agent, not Dietrich, and he has orders to save the life of a top scientist and to preserve a project of worldwide significance. Mary is reluctant to believe him, though.

Meanwhile, the man pretending to be Dietrich takes Benji to a yacht, where Ronald and Elizabeth are waiting. When the couple accuses the impostor of trying to double-cross them, he knocks them unconscious. As Benji escapes, the impostor Dietrich pursues the dog back to the hotel, which is now surrounded by police. Seeing that the impostor is holding Cindy at gunpoint in the car, Benji rushes at the man, knocks the gun to the ground, and rescues Cindy, as the police arrest the impostor.

Sometime later, Paul and Cindy play with Benji on a beach. Stelios explains to Mary that the impostor Dietrich used Benji to smuggle the coordinates for a meeting with a German scientist, who had created a formula for turning one barrel of oil into ten or twelve. The charlatan aimed to steal the formula and sell it to the highest bidder. Benji proudly looks upon a basket of puppies, the result of Tiffany’s “condition.”

Cast
 Benjean as Benji
 Patsy Garrett as Mary
 Cynthia Smith as Cindy Chapman
 Allen Fiuzat as Paul Chapman
 Tiffany as White Dog
 Ed Nelson as Chandler Dietrich
 Peter Bowles as Ronald
 Art Vasil as Stelios
 Bridget Armstrong as Elizabeth

Reception
Film critic Lawrence Van Gelder of The New York Times finds the movie to be the adventures of Benji in Athens.  He states: "As dog stars go, Benji can cock his head with the best of them".

References

External links
 Official web site of Benji and Joe Camp
 
 
 

1977 films
1977 comedy-drama films
Films about dogs
American sequel films
American comedy-drama films
Films set in Athens
Films shot in Greece
Benji
American children's films
Films directed by Joe Camp
Films scored by Euel Box
1970s English-language films
1970s American films